The Thunder is a 2019 Chinese web television series based on the actual events of Chinese authorities' raid of Boshe village in Guangdong province on December 2013. The series released on the Chinese streaming website iQiyi on 7 May 2019, followed by the television premiere on CCTV-8 three days later.

Filming of the series took placed in Guangdong, Hong Kong, Macau, France and Japan during March and August 2018, with over thousands of police personnel took part in filming process.

Cast members

Main 
 Huang Jingyu as Officer Li Fei
 Wang Jinsong as Lin Yaodong
 Wu Gang as Inspector Li Weimin
 Simon Yam as Undercover Officer Li Jianzhong (alias Zhao Jialiang)

Supporting 
 Li Mozhi as Chen Ke
 Zhang Xilin as Ma Yunbo
 Gong Lei as Lin Zonghui
 Yang Hua as Lin Yaohua
 Tang Xu as Cai Yongqiang
 Yu Jiema as Ma Wen
 Qian Bo as Lin Shuibo
 Zhao Xuan as Lin Shengwu
 Ai Dong as Chen Guangrong
 Gao Ming as Vice Minister Hao
 Shi Dasheng as Su Jianguo
 Shi Yanjing as Wang Zhixiong
 Zhao Chengsun as Cui Zhenjiang
 Felix Lok as Tan Sihe
 Lu Siyu as Song Yang
 Chen Yiheng as Liu Haoyu
 Ka Chun-hung as Zhong Wei
 Song Hanhuan as Lin Can 
 Chen Ning as Zuo Lan
 Liu Jianguo as Ke Jianhua
 Xiong Ruiling as Yu Hui
 Hao Baijie as He Ruilong
 Gao Jian as Cai Jun
 Zhang Xiaoyang as Lin Tianhao
 Li Fengqi as Lin Lan
 Bao Ma as Doctor Xiao
 Li Jiaxuan as Yang Liu
 Liu Yihan as Zhang Minhui
 Fa Zhiyuan as Yang Feng
 He Xun as Guan Xin
 Li Xiong as Huang Dacheng
 Luo Weilin as Liu Huaming
 Lai Yi as Zhou Kai
 Zhou Yue as Zhao Chao
 Yang Fengyu as Du Li
 Li Changhong as Chen Zili
 Feng Lizhou as Captain Qian
 Bu Wenhui as Su Kang
 Ou Xuanwei as Shen Yue
 Long Qingxia as Luo Jiayi
 Ma Xizhong as Luo Shaohong
 Xu Jingwei as Chen Wenze
 Ding Nan as Lin Jingwen
 Cai Xin as Ai Chao
 Wang Chengyang as Lin Shengwen
 Chen Jialun as Bao Xing

Reception 
Wang Kaihao of the China Daily says the series bears resemblance of Breaking Bad, the fictional American series that compared to the actual event.

Award and nominations

References

External links 
 

2019 Chinese television series debuts
Television series based on actual events
Television series about illegal drug trade
Television shows set in China
Television shows set in Hong Kong
Television shows set in Macau